Haris Rauf (Urdu: حارث رؤف; born 7 November 1993) is a Pakistani cricketer. He made his international debut for the Pakistan cricket team in January 2020. He made his Twenty20 debut for the Lahore Qalandars in the 2018 Abu Dhabi T20 Trophy on 5 October 2018. In November 2018, he was selected by the Lahore Qalandars in the players' draft for the 2019 Pakistan Super League tournament. He made his Test debut against England in December 2022.

Personal life
Haris Rauf was born in Rawalpindi, Punjab, Pakistan. On 23rd December 2022, Rauf married his classmate Muzna Masood Malik in a traditional nikkah ceremony in Islamabad.

Domestic career
When Rauf was a student in the Islamabad Model College for Boys I-8/3 he was more interested in football than cricket, helping his school lift the football trophy and being declared the best player of the tournament. He joined the cricket team of International Islamic University, Islamabad, and when its coach asked him to attend the Lahore Qalandars trials to be held in Gujranwala in September 2017, he was initially reluctant. However, he agreed and was spotted by Aaqib Javed, who pushed him to play cricket in Australia, after which he was selected for Lahore Qalandars for the 2018 Abu Dhabi T20 Trophy, which also marked his domestic career debut.

In March 2019, Rauf was named in Baluchistan's squad for the 2019 Pakistan Cup. He made his List A debut for Baluchistan in the 2019 Pakistan Cup on 2 April 2019. In September 2019, he was named in Northern's squad for the 2019–20 Quaid-e-Azam Trophy tournament. He made his first-class debut for Northern in the 2019–20 Quaid-e-Azam Trophy on 28 September 2019. In October 2019, the Pakistan Cricket Board (PCB) named him as one of the six players to watch ahead of the 2019–20 National T20 Cup tournament.

In December 2019, after originally only being in Australia to play for the Glenorchy Magpies in Tasmanian Grade Cricket, he joined the Melbourne Stars for 2019-20 Big Bash League season as a replacement for Dale Steyn who was injured. He took a five-wicket haul in his second match against the Hobart Hurricanes. On 8 January 2020, he took a hat-trick against the Sydney Thunder, becoming the first Pakistani and first Melbourne Stars bowler to do so in the BBL, with one delivery bowled at 151.3 km/h. On 16 February 2019, he took 4 for 23 and help Lahore Qalandars to win against Karachi Kings.

In December 2021, Rauf was signed by Yorkshire County Cricket Club to play in the 2022 cricket season in England.

International career
In January 2020, Rauf was named in Pakistan's Twenty20 International (T20I) squad for their series against Bangladesh. He made his T20I debut for Pakistan, against Bangladesh, on 24 January 2020.

In May 2020, the Pakistan Cricket Board (PCB) awarded him with a central contract, in a newly created Emerging Players' category, ahead of the 2020–21 season. In June 2020, he was named in a 29-man squad for Pakistan's tour to England during the COVID-19 pandemic. However, on 22 June 2020, Rauf was one of three players from Pakistan's squad to test positive for COVID-19. Although he had shown no previous symptoms of the virus, he was advised to go into a period of self-isolation. Rauf was eventually replaced in Pakistan's squad by Mohammad Amir, after he had provided five positive tests out of six for COVID-19 in the last month. On 30 July 2020, the PCB confirmed that Rauf had returned two consecutive negative tests, and was therefore eligible to fly to England to join the Pakistan squad.

On 29 October 2020, Rauf was named in Pakistan's One Day International (ODI) squad for the first match against Zimbabwe. He made his ODI debut for Pakistan, against Zimbabwe, on 30 October 2020. In November 2020, he was named in Pakistan's 35-man squad for their tour to New Zealand. In January 2021, he was named in Pakistan's Test squad for their series against South Africa. In March 2021, he was again named in Pakistan's Test squad, this time for their series against Zimbabwe. In June 2021, he was also named in Pakistan's Test squad for the series against the West Indies.

In September 2021, Rauf was named in Pakistan's squad for the 2021 ICC Men's T20 World Cup. He took a four-for against New Zealand to the win man-of-the-match for Pakistan in their second game of the tournament.

In February 2022, Rauf was named in Pakistan's Test squad for their series against Australia. In August 2022, Rauf was named in Pakistan's squad for Asia cup.

References

External links
 

1993 births
Living people
Pakistani cricketers
Pakistan Test cricketers
Pakistan One Day International cricketers
Pakistan Twenty20 International cricketers
Baluchistan cricketers
Lahore Qalandars cricketers
Cricketers from Rawalpindi
Melbourne Stars cricketers
Yorkshire cricketers